Igi-Halki was a king of Susa and Anshan (Elam) early in the 14th century BC. In one of his inscriptions, he says that “(the goddess) Manzat-Ishtar granted him the kingship of Susa and Anzan...”. The absence of ancestor kings in this inscription made scholars suggest that he started a new dynasty in Elam, usually called Igihalkids. Igi-Halki might have been installed by a Babylonian king Kurigalzu I, who conquered Susa about that time. He is also mentioned as the father of king Attar-kittah on two mace heads found in Chogha Zanbil, and in the inscription of king Shilhak-Inshushinak as the father of kings Pahir-ishan and Attar-Kittah.

References

Elamite kings
14th-century BC rulers
Igihalkid Dynasty